Adrien Barrère (baptised 'Adrien Baneux') (1874 Paris – 1931 Paris), was a French poster artist and painter, active in Paris during the Belle Époque.

After studying the law and medicine, Barrère turned to illustrating and particularly to the art of caricature, also designing a large number of posters for Parisian cinemas and Grand Guignol. His poster with caricatures of the Paris Medical Faculty, the original of which is held at University of Rouen and twice the size (72 x 116 cm) of later copies, was immensely popular - no medical student left without a copy - and 420 000 copies were printed.

His collaboration with Pathé was particularly successful, including a famous poster titled "Tous y mènent leurs enfants". In 1912, Le Courrier Cinématographique, a corporate journal, described him as 'Pathé's man of the hour and designer of more than two hundred posters of unfettered verve and imagination'.

Barrère chronicled and caricatured performers of the Paris stage, adopting a kindlier approach than that of Toulouse-Lautrec.

External links
Medizinhistorisches Museum

References

1874 births
1931 deaths
French poster artists
19th-century French painters
French male painters
20th-century French painters
20th-century French male artists
French caricaturists
19th-century French male artists
Belle Époque